Armand Krajnc (born 7 August 1973) is a former Swedish professional boxer who competed from 1996 to 2004. He held the WBO middleweight title from 1999 to 2002, and challenged once for the unified WBA (Super) and IBF super-middleweight titles in his final fight in 2004.

Early life
Krajnc's parents emigrated from Slovenia in the former Yugoslavia to southernmost Sweden, Scania before he was born. Before his professional career, he obtained first Dan, represented by the Black Belt, within the Karate style of Shotokan. This prepared him to become a hard-hitting boxer. When he began his professional career he moved to Malmö and commuted on a weekly basis to his new German boxing club and promoter in Lübeck in northern Germany.

Professional career
Known as "Lion", Krajnc turned pro in 1996, moving to Lübeck and signing up for a German promoter to avoid the Swedish ban on professional boxing. Three years later, in 1999, he won the WBO Middleweight Title by technical knock out (TKO) against Jason Matthews. Krajnc defended the title three times, before losing it to Harry Simon in 2002.

One of Krajnc's title defenses was against the Stockholm celebrity and fellow Swede Paolo Roberto. Krajnc had a low personal opinion of the latter and there was considerably controversy preceding the fight. For instance, Krajnc once compared Roberto to a fjolla (foolish female) and stated that Roberto had better talents in painting female toes, referencing an appearance by Roberto in a Swedish commercial TV-program. It was primarily Roberto's entertainment appearances in television, which Krajnc obviously found unfitting a professional boxer.

Based strictly on his boxing record, Roberto was unlikely to receive a title shot, and the personal animosity contributed to the fight being made. 3 November 2001, the match was held in Kranjc home arena in Germany. The distance between Lübeck and Scania is fairly short, and between 1500 and 2000 Scanian fans had met up in Lübeck, in order to, together with his German supporters, give their best possible support for Krajnc. Roberto, who was well-known from Swedish television, not only for boxing, would rather have met Krajnc in Mariehamn, Åland. But the challenger couldn't chose location of this event. Which in Sweden became a very media covered event (though the ban on professional boxing made it impossible to televise it live).

Against a combination of joined Germans and Scanias supporters, Roberto's worst assumptions regarding the crowd, proved to be true. He was "the crook" - and Krajnc "the hero", only a few Swedish journalists from Stockholm presumably held on Roberto. Surprisingly the challenger, who before this fight had put on a great deal of muscles, took the fight to the cards. Here, however, Kranjc won easily and unanimously, while Aftonbladet columnist Lars Angrell wrote "Why wasn't the assaulting beatings of Paolo Roberto stopped !?". After the match Kranjc was magnanimous towards Roberto at the press conference, and claimed Paolo Roberto as a great boxer. Their enmity ended with the match, and so did the ban on limited professional boxing after a total prohibition over a period of more than 30 years.

In June 2001 Krajnc vacated his WBO title after a dispute with promotional group Universum Box-Promotion, but was later reinstated as champion by the WBO. In 2004 he challenged WBA and IBF Super Middleweight Title holder Sven Ottke but lost a decision.

Life after boxing
Krajnc nowadays lives in Ystad, also in Scania where he teaches boxing to youngsters. He's also competed in the tv-series Mästarnas mästare (Champion of Champions), which he also won.

Professional boxing record

References

External links

1973 births
Middleweight boxers
Living people
Swedish male boxers
Swedish people of Slovenian descent
Super-middleweight boxers
World Boxing Organization champions
World middleweight boxing champions
Sportspeople from Skåne County